"Showing Out (Get Fresh at the Weekend)" is the debut single of English pop duo Mel and Kim, released in September 1986. The song became a chart hit, peaking at number three on the UK Singles Chart and reaching number one in four European countries. British magazine Classic Pop ranked "Showing Out (Get Fresh at the Weekend)" at number three on their list of the "Top 40 Stock Aitken Waterman Songs" in 2021.

Background
The single's B-side, "System", was originally intended to be the duo's debut release, but after getting to know the sisters, Pete Waterman felt that the song was too soft for their personalities and halted the single's pressing. Mike Stock then wrote "Showing Out (Get Fresh at the Weekend)" for the duo, influenced by the Chicago garage house sound. "It became very clear that the tracks were being written around us, for us, and they were feeding off us," Kim Appleby said of the creative process with Stock Aitken Waterman after "System" was replaced by "Showing Out".

The image that Mel and Kim projected in the song's video and on the second version of the single sleeve was decided when Kim wore a hat and harem pants to an appearance at London nightclub The Hippodrome. Supreme Records managing director Nick East decided on the spot that her look would be used to define the act. "He looked at me and he said that's the image," Kim said.

Chart performance
The single peaked at number three on the UK Singles Chart in November 1986 and was certified silver by the British Phonographic Industry (BPI) for sales exceeding 250,000 copies.  "Showing Out (Get Fresh at the Weekend)" reached number one in Belgium, the Netherlands, Switzerland, and West Germany.

Track listings
UK 7-inch (SUPE 107)
 "Showing Out"
 "System" (House mix [edit]) 3:47

UK 12-inch (SUPE T 107 / RCA PT 40990)
 "Showing Out" (Extended mix)
 "System" (House mix) 9:00

UK 12-inch remix (SUPE TX 107)
 "Showing Out" (The Mortgage mix)
 "System" (House mix) 9:00

UK 12-inch remix (SUPE TZ 107)
 "Showing Out" (The Freehold mix)
 "System" (House mix) 9:00

Charts

Weekly charts

Year-end charts

Certifications

References

1986 debut singles
1986 songs
Dutch Top 40 number-one singles
Mel and Kim songs
Number-one singles in Germany
Number-one singles in Switzerland
Song recordings produced by Stock Aitken Waterman
Songs written by Pete Waterman
Songs written by Matt Aitken
Songs written by Mike Stock (musician)
Supreme Records singles